Allofs is a surname. Notable people with the surname include:

Klaus Allofs (born 1956), German general manager
Thomas Allofs (born 1959), German footballer